Aikinite is a sulfide mineral of lead, copper and bismuth with formula PbCuBiS3. It forms black to grey or reddish brown acicular orthorhombic crystals with a Mohs hardness of 2 to 2.5 and a specific gravity of 6.1 to 6.8. It was originally found in 1843 in the Beryozovskoye deposit, Ural Mountains. It is named after Arthur Aikin (1773–1854), an English geologist.

It has been found in Western Tasmania, in mines located near Dundas, Tasmania

References

Lead minerals
Copper(I) minerals
Bismuth minerals
Sulfosalt minerals
Orthorhombic minerals
Minerals in space group 62